is a former Japanese football player and manager. He is the currently an assistant manager of Gamba Osaka.

Playing career
Kodama was born in Takatsuki on October 8, 1982. He joined J1 League club Gamba Osaka from youth team in 2001. Although he played as left side midfielder, he could not become a regular player. In 2006, he moved to J1 club Kyoto Purple Sanga. He became a regular player as left side back. However the club finished at the bottom place and was relegated to J2 League end of 2006 season. In 2007, he moved to J1 club Shimizu S-Pulse. He played many matches as regular left side back and the club won the 2nd place 2008 J.League Cup. In 2009, the club gained new player Kosuke Ota and Kodama also played as center back not only side back. However his opportunity to play decreased from 2010. In 2012, he moved to J1 club Cerezo Osaka. However he could hardly play in the match. In 2013, he moved to J1 club Oita Trinita. Although he played many matches until summer 2013, his opportunity to play decreased from summer and the club finished at the bottom place. He retired end of 2013 season.

Club statistics

References

External links

1982 births
Living people
Association football people from Osaka Prefecture
People from Takatsuki, Osaka
Japanese footballers
J1 League players
Gamba Osaka players
Kyoto Sanga FC players
Shimizu S-Pulse players
Cerezo Osaka players
Oita Trinita players
Association football defenders